Bobby Ray Maples (December 28, 1942February 16, 1991) was an American football center and linebacker.  He was born in Mount Vernon, Texas, which is also the birthplace of Don Meredith. Maples and his older brother Butch played collegiately for Baylor University and for respectively for NFL & AFL teams. Bobby Maples played professionally in the American Football League where he was an All-Star in 1968 with the Houston Oilers  He also played for the National Football League's Pittsburgh Steelers and Denver Broncos before retiring in 1978.

Maples died of Hodgkin's disease in February, 1991.

See also
Other American Football League Players

References

1942 births
1991 deaths
People from Mount Vernon, Texas
Players of American football from Texas
American football linebackers
American football centers
Baylor Bears football players
Houston Oilers players
Pittsburgh Steelers players
Denver Broncos players
American Football League All-Star players
American Football League players